Harpalus obnixus is a species of ground beetle in the subfamily Harpalinae. It was described by Casey in 1924.

References

obnixus
Beetles described in 1924